The Master of Surgery (Latin: Magister Chirurgiae) is an advanced qualification in surgery.  Depending upon the degree, it may be abbreviated ChM, MCh, MChir or MS.  At a typical medical school the program lasts between two and three years. The possession of a medical degree is a prerequisite. The ChM can be awarded on both clinical and academic competency or on academic competency. The regulations may ask for surgical experience and a thesis topic that is not purely medical.

History

The Masters of Surgery, or ChM is an advanced qualification in surgical medicine, established in Great Britain in the middle of the 19th century. The qualification was designed to be awarded as a higher degree to the Bachelor of Surgery degree (usually ChB).

Many universities have stopped holding written and clinical examinations for the ChM, and focused solely on the thesis and oral examination. Only Oxford and Cambridge still have a ("Part One") examination before submission of the thesis and oral examination on the same for the degrees which they abbreviate as MCh and MChir respectively.

Many universities stopped offering the ChM award when it became common for trainee surgeons to take the FRCS examination of one or other Royal College of Surgeons in basic sciences and clinical subjects.

ChM Today
Following the success of its MSc in Surgical Sciences, the University of Edinburgh Medical School re-established the ChM award in 2011, as an online distance learning degree, in collaboration with the Royal College of Surgeons Edinburgh. The focus of the ChM was to prepare advanced surgical trainees for their FRCS examination, thereby reinstating the purpose of the ChM degree and aligning it with the ISCP curriculum. The ChM therefore combines the academic and professional development of the surgeon approaching independent consultancy. The ChM consolidates the application of specialist surgical knowledge in any clinical setting and is of relevance to independent surgical practice anywhere in the world. The online distance learning ChM uses case and problem-based learning and combines both academic and research components. Each ChM degree programme carries 120 credits which are taught at postgraduate SCQF level 12. The University of Edinburgh and the Royal College of Surgeons of Edinburgh currently offer ChM degrees in 5 specialities (General Surgery, Vascular & Endovascular Surgery, Urology, Clinical Ophthalmology and Trauma and Orthopaedic Surgery).

References

Master's degrees
Medical degrees